The Larut Wars were a series of four wars started in July 1861 and ended with the signing of the Pangkor Treaty of 1874. The conflict was fought among local Chinese secret societies over the control of mining areas in Perak which later involved rivalry between Raja Abdullah and Ngah Ibrahim, making it a war of succession.

First war (1861–62) 
The First Larut War began in July 1861 when arguments over control of watercourse to their mines escalated and led members of the Hai San Society to drive the members of the Ghee Hin society out of Klian Baharu (now known as Kamunting). The Governor of Straits Settlements, William Orfeur Cavenagh intervened and the Mentri of Larut, Ngah Ibrahim, was made to compensate the Ghee Hin with $17,447 on behalf of the Sultan of Perak.

Second war (1865) 
The Second Larut War took place in 1865 and was sparked off by a gambling quarrel in June of that year between members of the two opposing secret societies. The Hai San members took 14 Ghee Hin as prisoners, 13 of whom were killed. The 14th escaped to inform his clan and the Ghee Hin retaliated by attacking a Hai San village, razing it to the ground and killing 40 men in the process. The battle continued back and forth and spread to Province Wellesley and the island of Penang while other secret societies started to join the fray. Both sides were later exhausted and finally decided to come to terms. An official inquiry took place and both the Hai San and Ghee Hin societies were fined $5,000 each for violating the peace of Penang and their leaders exiled.

By around 1870, there were a combined total of about 40,000 Hakka and Cantonese mine workers in the Larut district and the mining areas between the two groups were near to each other. It is this proximity that might explain how the next battle began.

Third war (1871–72) 
The Third Larut War was rumoured to have erupted in 1871 over a scandal - an extra-marital relationship involving the Ghee Hin leader and the wife of a nephew of the Hai San leader, Chung Keng Quee. Upon discovery, the adulterous couple was caught, tortured, put into a pig basket and thrown into a disused mining pond where they drowned. Avenging the death of their leader, Ghee Hin had 4,000 mercenaries imported from mainland China via Penang attack the Hai San and for the first time, the Hai San were driven out of Larut. About 10,000 Hai San men sought refuge in Penang. Months later, the Hai San supported by Ngah Ibrahim recovered their Matang and Larut mines. At this time, Raja Abdullah a claimant to the throne of Perak (in opposition to Sultan Ismail who was installed in Abdullah's absence) after Sultan Ali (r. 1865–1871) died in 1871, and an enemy of Ngah Ibrahim, took sides against the Hai San and Ngah Ibrahim and the wars between the Chinese miners transformed into civil war involving the Malay chiefs of Perak.

Fourth war and the Pangkor Treaty (1873–74) 

The Fourth Larut War occurred in 1873, merely a year after the previous battle. Weeks after Hai Sans regained Larut, Ghee Hin, supported by Raja Abdullah, counter-attacked with arms and men from Singapore and China. Ngah Ibrahim's properties in Matang were destroyed. Local Malay residents were also killed and their property, destroyed. Trouble spread to Krian, Pangkor and Dinding. The quarrelling Malay chiefs who had taken sides in the Larut Wars were now alarmed at the disorder created by the Chinese miners and secret societies. The Straits Settlement Penang Chinese seeing their investments destroyed in the Larut Wars sought intervention from the British. Over 40,000 Chinese from the Go-Kuan and Si-Kuan were engaged in the fratricidal war involving the Perak royal family.

The Perak sultanate, involved in a protracted succession struggle, was unable to maintain order. Things were increasingly getting out of hand and chaos was proving bad for the Malays, Chinese and British. In her book "The Golden Chersonese and The Way Thither" (Published 1892 G.P. Putnam's Sons) Victorian traveller and adventuress Isabella Lucy Bird (1831–1904) describes how Raja Muda Abdullah as he then was turned to his friend in Singapore, Tan Kim Ching. Tan, together with an English merchant in Singapore drafted a letter to Governor Sir Andrew Clarke which Abdullah signed. The letter expressed Abdullah's desire to place Perak under British protection, and "to have a man of sufficient abilities to show (him) a good system of government." On 26 September 1872 Chung Keng Quee had already presented a petition, signed by himself and 44 other Chinese leaders, seeking British interference following the attack of 12,000 men of Chung Shan by 2,000 men of Sen Ning. (The Petition)

The need to restore law and order in Perak gave cause for a new British policy concerning intervention in the affairs of the Malay States which resulted in the Pangkor Treaty. In 1874, the Straits Settlements governor Sir Andrew Clarke convened a meeting on Pulau Pangkor, at which Sultan Abdullah was installed on the throne of Perak in preference to his rival, Sultan Ismail.

Documents were signed on 20 January 1874 aboard the ship The Pluto at Pangkor Island to settle the Chinese dispute, clear the Sultan succession dispute and pave the way for the acceptance of British Residency - Captain Speedy was appointed to administer Larut as assistant to the British Resident.

Chung Keng Quee and Chin Ah Yam, leaders of the Hai San and Ghee Hin, respectively, were ennobled by the British with the title of Chinese Kapitan and the town of Larut was renamed Taiping ("太平" in Chinese, meaning "everlasting peace") as a confirmation of the new state of truce. Three days later, Chung Keng Quee was appointed a member of the Pacification Commission headed by Captain S. Dunlop and Messrs. Frank Swettenham and William A. Pickering - one of the objectives of the commission was to arrange an amicable settlement of the squabbles over the tin mines at Larut.

The Commissioners decided to allocate the mines in Klian Pauh (Taiping) to the Hai Sans and the mines in Klian Bharu (Kamunting) to the Ghee Hins.

Scholar Irene Liao has connected with this settlement the establishment in the 1880s in Taiping of the first temple in the Malay peninsula devoted to goddess He Xiangu (何仙姑). Liao sees the establishment of the temple as an “effort to reconcile” after the wars, and “as part of a cultural strategy to symbolically integrate all Guangdong immigrants into one community.” Many Chinese miners came from Zengcheng District, the main center of the cult of He Xiangu.

Aftermath 

The newly appointed British Resident Minister James W. W. Birch was assassinated in 1875 on the orders of Lela Pandak Lam (alias Dato Maharaja Lela). Lela was a prince and mufti from Upper Perak, who was either motivated to protect his economic interests by restoring slavery – which had been prohibited by the British – or restore independence to Perak – a view commonly held by modern Malaysian nationalists. In the resulting Perak War (1875–76), the British retaliated by defeating the rebels, executing Lela and expelling both Raja Abdullah and Ngah Ibrahim to the Seychelles on the accusation that they had been involved in the conspiracy to assassinate Birch. The British appointed Yusuf Sharifuddin Muzaffar Shah to regent of Perak in 1877, finally appointing him as the new sultan of Perak in 1886.

References

Further reading 
 Chung Keng Quee
 Southeast Asia: a historical encyclopaedia, from Angkor Wat to East Timor, Volume 2Southeast Asia: A Historical Encyclopedia, from Angkor Wat to East Timor, Edited by Keat Gin Ooi, Published by ABC-CLIO, 2004, P775
 Ipoh: when tin was king By Ho Tak Ming, Perak Academy, 2009, PP9&67
 Thai south and Malay north: ethnic interactions on the plural Peninsula, Michael John Montesano, Patrick Jory, NUS Press, 2008, P208
 Fifteenth Report of the United States Civil Service Commission, Congressional edition, Volume 3826, United States Congress, US G.P.O., 1899, PP529, 530, 534
 The New Encyclopædia Britannica, Volume 9, 2003, PP113,278
 Sir Frank Swettenham's Malayan journals, 1874-1876 by Sir Frank Athelstane Swettenham, illustrated, reprint, Oxford University Press, 1975
 Nineteenth-century Malaya: the origins of British political control, Volume 11 of London oriental series, Charles Donald Cowan, Oxford University Press, 1967
 In search of Southeast Asia: a modern history, David P. Chandler, David Joel Steinberg, University of Hawaii Press, 1987, 
 In quest of unity: the centralisation theme in Malaysian Federal-State relations, 1957–75, Issue 39 of Occasional paper, Institute of Southeast Asian Studies, Robert O. Tilman, Institute of Southeast Asian, 1976
 Monthly summary of commerce and finance of the United States, United States. Dept. of the Treasury. Bureau of Statistics, United States. Dept. of Commerce and Labor. Bureau of Statistics, United States. Bureau of Foreign and Domestic Commerce, GPO, 1901, PP1249&1250
 The protected Malay States, 1874-1895, Emily Sadka, University of Malaya Press, 1968
 Papers on Malayan history, K. G. Tregonning, Journal South-East Asian History, 1962
 Papers on Malay subjects, Richard James Wilkinson, Oxford University Press, 1971
 A history of Perak, Issue 3 of M.B.R.A.S. reprints, Sir Richard Olof Winstedt, Richard James Wilkinson, Sir William Edward Maxwell, MBRAS, 1974
 Pickering: protector of Chinese, Robert Nicholas Jackson, Oxford U. P., 1966
 The development of the tin mining industry of Malaya, Yat Hoong Yip, University of Malaya Press, 1969
 The Malayan tin industry to 1914: with special reference to the states of Perak, Selangor, Negri, Sembilan, and Pahang, Volume 14 of Monographs of the Association for Asian Studies, Lin Ken Wong, University of Arizona Press, 1965
 The Malay States, 1877-1895: political change and social policy, Philip Fook Seng Loh, Oxford University Press, 1969

History of Perak
Larut, Matang and Selama District
Wars involving pre-independence Malaysia
Conflicts in 1861
Conflicts in 1862
Conflicts in 1865
Conflicts in 1871
Conflicts in 1872
Organized crime conflicts
Civil wars in Malaysia
1860s in British Malaya
1870s in British Malaya
Triad (organized crime)